Urban Development and Housing Department is a department of Government of Sikkim. This looks after the management of urban areas of the Indian state of Sikkim, including several civic utilities of the capital, Gangtok.

External links
Home page

Government of Sikkim
Housing organisations based in India
State government departments of India
Sikkim
Sikkim